Playing Major League Baseball in four decades has been attained by only 31 players in the league's history, dating from the 1870s to the present day.

Introduction
Since 1900 (the first year that a player could play in a "fourth decade"), every completed decade except the 1940s has added at least one player to the list.

Outside of skill and durability, a player must usually have some "generational luck" to have started his career in the later years of a decade, so that if he is still playing 21–24 years later, he is playing in the early years of a fourth decade. For example, Albert Pujols started his career in 2001, so he would have had to play 30 seasons to make the list. Whereas Bill Buckner, whose career started in the last year of the 1960s, finished his career in the first year of the 1990s, requiring only 22 seasons to make the list. Most of the players on the list started their careers in the final or second-to-last year of their first decade and finished their careers in the first or second year of their fourth decade (a notable exception is Nolan Ryan, whose 27 seasons played is a major league record). 

Although it has always been possible for a retired three-decade player to make a cameo appearance in a fourth decade for the purpose of joining the list, the only player to have actually done this was Minnie Miñoso, who took the field twice for his former team, the White Sox, at the ages of 50 and 54 as part of a publicity stunt organized by owners Bill and Mike Veeck. Such a stunt has become less likely in the modern era after the introduction of the 40 man roster and league minimum salaries.

Five-decade players 
Minnie Miñoso, Nick Altrock and Satchel Paige are the only three players to have appeared in major league baseball games in five different decades. None were continuously active at the MLB level; Altrock was a coach on the Washington Senators and appeared sparingly over just seventeen games in a twenty-two season span from 1912-1933, while Satchel Paige spent significant time in the minors during his 40 years in professional baseball. Paige was added to the list post mortem, due to Major League Baseball incorporating Negro league records (and thus his career in the 1920s and 1930s) into its own history in 2021.

Unofficial four-decade players 
Major League Baseball recognizes the first major league season as 1876, the inaugural season of the National League. The following three players played parts of their careers in the 1850s and 1860s, and do not qualify as four-decade players, although they played four decades at the highest level of play available to them at the time: Joe Start (1859-1886), Candy Nelson (1867-1890), and Deacon White (1868-1890).

African Americans have played professionally since 1878 when Bud Fowler first played professionally, although he had been playing since at least 1877 and possibly as early as 1872. Major League Baseball does not consider any players or leagues prior to 1920 to be Major league players. The following players played four decades at the highest level of play possible to them at the time: Bud Fowler (1878-1904), Clarence Williams (1886-1913), Candy Jim Taylor (1904-1942), Smokey Joe Williams (1905-1932), John Henry Lloyd (1906-1932), Pelayo Chacón (1908-1931), Oscar Charleston (1915-1941), José Fernández (1915-1947), George Britt (1917-1942), and Bill Holland (1919-1941). Taylor also played at the highest level possible to him for five decades.

Future candidates 
It is now unlikely that the 2020s will add any players to the list. No player who debuted in 1999 or earlier made an MLB roster in the 2020, 2021 or 2022 seasons. Rick Ankiel (debuted 1999) ended his attempt at a comeback in 2019, and Bartolo Colón's (debuted 1997) reported interest in pitching for the New York Mets in 2022 came to nothing.

Baseball-Reference.com lists 42 still-active players who debuted in 2009 or earlier and have a chance to make the list by playing until 2030. The youngest such player is Madison Bumgarner, born in 1989, who will turn 41 during the 2030 season.

List of players
The players are listed by primary position played and years spanning their careers. Fifteen players from the group have been inducted into the National Baseball Hall of Fame. Of the 31 players, 12 were primarily pitchers, six were primarily catchers, seven were primarily outfielders, and six were primarily infielders; the group covers virtually the complete range of baseball positions, missing only a third baseman.

References

External links

 

Four decades